Hethel Old Thorn is a   nature reserve south-west of Norwich in Norfolk. It is managed by the Norfolk Wildlife Trust.

This is the smallest wildlife trust nature reserve in Britain, consisting of one ancient hawthorn tree, which may date to the thirteenth century. In 1755 its girth was recorded as 9 feet 1 inch, and it has now decayed to a much smaller size, but it is still healthy.

References

Norfolk Wildlife Trust